City Stadium is a multi-use stadium in Molodechno, Belarus. It is currently used mostly for football matches and is the home ground of Molodechno-DYuSSh-4. The stadium holds 4,800 spectators.

History
The stadium was opened in 1946 and has been used by a local club FC Molodechno ever since. It was known as Metallurg Stadium until 1993, before being renamed to City Stadium. Between 2006 and 2008 it was a home venue for Lokomotiv Minsk and in 2015 it was used by Isloch Minsk Raion.

International use
Over the years Molodechno City Stadium has been used as an occasional home venue for Belarus national under-21 team and Belarus women's national team. It has hosted some games of UEFA youth (U17/19) championships qualifying groups.

In 1996, it the stadium hosted a friendly match of Belarus national team against Azerbaijan. In mid-90s it was also used as a home venue for Dinamo-93 Minsk in European Cups.

References

External links
Stadium profile at pressball.by

Football venues in Belarus
Buildings and structures in Minsk Region